Amos 3 is the third chapter of the Book of Amos in the Hebrew Bible or the Old Testament of the Christian Bible. This book contains the prophecies attributed to the prophet Amos, especially God's extraordinary love, being repaid by Israel with ingratitude, of necessity calls for judgments. It is a part of the Book of the Twelve Minor Prophets.

Text 
The original text was written in Hebrew language. This chapter is divided into 15 verses.

Textual witnesses
Some early manuscripts containing the text of this chapter in Hebrew are of the Masoretic Text tradition, which includes the Codex Cairensis (895), the Petersburg Codex of the Prophets (916), Aleppo Codex (10th century), Codex Leningradensis (1008). Fragments cumulatively containing all verses of this chapter in Hebrew were found among the Dead Sea Scrolls including 4Q78 (4QXIIc; 75–50 BCE) with extant verses 1–15; and 4Q82 (4QXIIg; 25 BCE) with extant verses 1–2.

There is also a translation into Koine Greek known as the Septuagint, made in the last few centuries BCE. Extant ancient manuscripts of the Septuagint version include Codex Vaticanus (B; B; 4th century), Codex Alexandrinus (A; A; 5th century) and Codex Marchalianus (Q; Q; 6th century).

Verse 1
  Hear this word that the Lord hath spoken against you, O children of Israel,
 against the whole family which I brought up from the land of Egypt, saying,
 "Hear this word": Use three times in the whole book (Amos 3:1, 4:1).

Verse 2
 You only have I known of all the families of the earth:
 therefore I will punish you for all your iniquities.
 "Known": i.e. Israel was the only nation whom Jehovah 'knew' in this special sense, and visited with the tokens of His friendship.
 "Therefore I will punish you for all your iniquities" or "visit upon you"; or "against you"; in a way of chastisement and correction; the Lord was determined to make an example of them (cf. ).

See also

Related Bible parts: Amos 2, 1 Peter 4

Notes

References

Sources

External links

Jewish
Amos 3 Hebrew with Parallel English
Amos 3 Hebrew with Rashi's Commentary

Christian
Amos 3 English Translation with Parallel Latin Vulgate

03